The Caltex Tournament was a golf tournament held at Paraparaumu Beach Golf Club in Paraparaumu, New Zealand from 1955 to 1972.

History 
Bob Charles and Peter Thomson each won the event five times, while Kel Nagle won it four times and Dave Thomas won it twice. There were no playoffs and three of the tournaments ended in a tie. 

As of the early 1970s, the tournament was part of the PGA of New Zealand circuit.

Winners

1Reduced to 54 holes because of bad weather.

References

Golf tournaments in New Zealand
Recurring sporting events established in 1955
Recurring events disestablished in 1972
1955 establishments in New Zealand
1972 disestablishments in New Zealand